The 1950–51 Czechoslovak Extraliga season was the eighth season of the Czechoslovak Extraliga, the top level of ice hockey in Czechoslovakia. Eight teams participated in the league, and ZSJ SKP Ceske Budejovice won the championship.

Standings

External links
History of Czechoslovak ice hockey

Czechoslovak Extraliga seasons
Czech
1950 in Czechoslovak sport
1951 in Czechoslovak sport